Mark Steven Bortz (born February 12, 1961) is an American former professional football player who was a guard in the National Football League (NFL). He attended the University of Iowa and was drafted by the Chicago Bears in 1983.

Professional career
The Bears' 1983 draft class is regarded as one of the best all-time; providing 7 starters, including 3 for the offensive line - Bortz, fellow guard Tom Thayer, and tackle Jim Covert. When interviewed about the draft class for nfl.com, Coach Mike Ditka stated that Bortz was a converted defensive player, with great feet, and he formed part of a solid offensive line.

A two-time Pro Bowler, Bortz won a Super Bowl as a member of the 1985 Chicago Bears. He also holds the record for most playoff appearances by a Bear with 13.

Personal life
On March 7, 2013, a two-story house belonging to Bortz in Liberty, Illinois burned down. Firefighters had attempted to save the house, but the house was fully engulfed in flames by arrival.

References

1961 births
Living people
American football offensive linemen
Iowa Hawkeyes football players
Chicago Bears players
National Conference Pro Bowl players
People from Pardeeville, Wisconsin
Players of American football from Wisconsin
Ed Block Courage Award recipients